Brahea calcarea is a species of palm. It is found in Guatemala and Mexico and is threatened by habitat loss.

References

Royal Botanic Gardens, Kew - ePIC: Brahea

calcarea
Flora of Guatemala
Flora of Mexico
Taxonomy articles created by Polbot